The Lhasa Airport Expressway, officially the Lhasa to Gonggar Airport Expressway, also shortened to the Lagong Expressway  is an expressway that links Lhasa Gonggar Airport to the city center of Lhasa, the capital of the autonomous region of Tibet, China. The expressway is designated as S1, however this designation is unsigned, and signposts on the expressway simply refer to it as the Airport Expressway.

Construction
The expressway from Lhasa to Gonggar Airport in Shannan Prefecture is the first expressway to be built in the Tibet Autonomous Region.
Construction began in April 2009.
In May 2011 it was reported that the bridges and culverts were complete and tunnel construction was almost finished, with
66 percent of the road paved.
The expressway was completed eleven months ahead of schedule early in July 2011 at a cost of 1.59 billion yuan.
The opening ceremony was held on 17 July 2011, attended by Vice President Xi Jinping.
Tibetan traditional dancers performed during the ceremony.

Description
It provides a link from metropolitan Lhasa's downtown to Lhasa Gonggar Airport, the international airport serving the city. The expressway begins in the south end just west of the airport, and ends in the southeastern part of Doilungdêqên District, in Liuwu New Area near Lhasa railway station.
Roadside lighting is solar powered.
Travel time is shortened to 30 minutes, half the time with the previous route.
Formerly travelers from the airport used the congested China National Highway 318.

The expressway connects at an interchange with China National Highway 349 just north of the Yarlung Tsangpo River. This section of China National Highway 349 opened on 8 December 2017 for trial operations.

References

Sources

 

Transport in China
Doilungdêqên District
Qüxü County
Expressways in Tibet